Fractalkine, also known as chemokine (C-X3-C motif) ligand 1, is a protein that in humans is encoded by the CX3CL1 gene.

Function 

Fractalkine is a large cytokine protein of 373 amino acids, it contains multiple domains and is the only known member of the CX3C chemokine family.  It is also commonly known under the names fractalkine (in humans) and neurotactin (in mice).  The polypeptide structure of CX3CL1 differs from the typical structure of other chemokines.  For example, the spacing of the characteristic N-terminal cysteines differs; there are three amino acids separating the initial pair of cysteines in CX3CL1, with none in CC chemokines and only one intervening amino acid in CXC chemokines.  CX3CL1 is produced as a long protein (with 373-amino acid in humans) with an extended mucin-like stalk and a chemokine domain on top. The mucin-like stalk permits it to bind to the surface of certain cells.  However a soluble (90 kD) version of this chemokine has also been observed. Soluble CX3CL1 potently chemoattracts T cells and monocytes, while the cell-bound chemokine promotes strong adhesion of leukocytes to activated endothelial cells, where it is primarily expressed. CX3CL1 elicits its adhesive and migratory functions by interacting with the chemokine receptor CX3CR1.  Its gene is located on human chromosome 16 along with some CC chemokines known as CCL17 and CCL22.

Fractalkine is found commonly throughout the brain, particularly in neural cells, and its receptor is known to be present on microglial cells. It has also been found to be essential for microglial cell migration. CX3CL1 is also up-regulated in the hippocampus during a brief temporal window following spatial learning, the purpose of which may be to regulate glutamate-mediated neurotransmission tone. This indicates a possible role for the chemokine in the protective plasticity process of synaptic scaling.

References

External links

Further reading 

 
 
 
 
 
 
 
 
 
 
 
 
 
 
 

Cytokines